The 3rd Hong Kong Awards ceremony, honored the best films of 1983 and took place on 4 August 1984, at the Regent International Hotel, Hong Kong. The ceremony was hosted by Chung King-fai, during the ceremony awards are presented in 12 categories. The ceremony was sponsored by RTHK and City Entertainment Magazine.

Awards
Winners are listed first, highlighted in boldface, and indicated with a double dagger.

References

External links
 Official website of the Hong Kong Film Awards

1984
1983 film awards
1984 in Hong Kong